Organic Music For A Digital World is the third studio album by Canadian rapper and producer DL Incognito.

Track listing

2006 albums
DL Incognito albums